The Booker T. Set is a 1969 studio album by the Southern soul band Booker T. & the M.G.'s.  Other than one original track, it consists mostly of instrumental covers of popular songs from the previous several years.  Multiple genres of music are covered, including folk, soul, jazz, funk, and rock.

Track listing

Side One
"The Horse" (Jesse James)
"Love Child" (R. Dean Taylor, Deke Richards, Pam Sawyer, Frank Wilson, Henry Cosby)
"Sing a Simple Song" (Sly Stone)
"Lady Madonna" (John Lennon, Paul McCartney)
"Mrs. Robinson" (Paul Simon)

Side Two
"This Guy's in Love with You" (Burt Bacharach, Hal David)
"Light My Fire" (Robby Krieger, Jim Morrison, Ray Manzarek, John Densmore)
"Michelle" (John Lennon, Paul McCartney)
"You're All I Need to Get By" (Nickolas Ashford, Valerie Simpson)
"I've Never Found a Girl (To Love Me Like You Do)" (Eddie Floyd, Booker T. Jones, Alvertis Isbell)
"It's Your Thing" (O'Kelly Isley, Ronald Isley, Rudolph Isley)

Personnel
Booker T. & the M.G.s
 Booker T. Jones - Hammond organ, Hohner clavinet, piano, vibraphone
 Steve Cropper - electric guitar, sitar
 Donald Dunn - bass guitar
 Al Jackson Jr. - drums, tambourine

References

Booker T. & the M.G.'s albums
1969 albums
Stax Records albums
Covers albums
Atlantic Records albums
Albums produced by Al Jackson Jr.
Albums produced by Donald "Duck" Dunn
Albums produced by Steve Cropper
Albums produced by Booker T. Jones